The Shukhov Tower on the Oka River (also Dzerzhinsk High-Voltage Mast, Shukhov Oka Tower) is the world’s only diagrid hyperboloid transmission tower.  It is located in Russia, in the western suburbs of Nizhny Novgorod, on the left bank of the Oka River near Dzerzhinsk (about 12 km away from the city center, near Dachny village). The tower is one of several structures designed by Russian engineer and scientist Vladimir Shukhov; its power lines, however, were decommissioned in 1989.

History
The Shukhov Tower was a part of a 110kV three-phase AC transmission line crossing the Oka River commissioned between 1927 and 1929.

In 1989, the power line was rerouted and the 20 and 68 metre pylons were dismantled.  The 128 metre pylons were left intact as a monument.  Today, only one of the 128-metre pylons stands as the other was illegally demolished for steel scrap in May 2005.

Structure
The Shukhov Tower consists of five  steel lattice hyperboloid sections, stacked on top of each other. The sections are made of straight profiles, the ends of which rest against circular foundations. The construction of the individual sections is an example of a doubly-ruled surface.

Present condition

RAO UES, Russia's electricity company, used Shukhov's unique constructions for 70 years. The existing pylon currently requires maintenance and FGC UES is scheduled to repair it.

Partially-hyperboloid pylons of similar design can be seen near Cádiz, Spain.

See also
 Shukhov Tower
 List of hyperboloid structures
 List of towers
 Zaporizhzhia Pylon Triple

References

General
 Elizabeth C. English, “Arkhitektura i mnimosti”: The origins of Soviet avant-garde rationalist architecture in the Russian mystical-philosophical and mathematical intellectual tradition”, a dissertation in architecture, 264 p., University of Pennsylvania, 2000.
"Vladimir G. Suchov 1853-1939. Die Kunst der sparsamen Konstruktion.",  Rainer Graefe und andere, 192 S., Deutsche Verlags-Anstalt, Stuttgart, 1990, .
Jesberg, Paulgerd   Die Geschichte der Bauingenieurkunst, Deutsche Verlags-Anstalt, Stuttgart (Germany), 1996; pp. 198–9.

External links
3D model Shukhov tower on the Oka River

Photos Shukhov towers on the Oka Riever
Video about the Shukhov tower on the Oka River

Towers completed in 1929
Constructivist architecture
Lattice shell structures by Vladimir Shukhov
High-tech architecture
Towers in Russia
Electric power infrastructure in Russia
Pylons
Powerline river crossings
Buildings and structures in Nizhny Novgorod Oblast
Hyperboloid structures
Cultural heritage monuments of regional significance in Nizhny Novgorod Oblast